Timeline of Mustafa Kemal Atatürk is a time line of events during the lifespan of Mustafa Kemal Atatürk. The time line also includes the background events starting with the Sultan Abdul Hamid II.

See also
 Timeline of the Turkish War of Independence 
 Timeline of Turkish history
 World War I timeline

References 

Mustafa Kemal Atatürk